Erin Kelly was born in London in 1976 and grew up in Romford, Essex.

She has been working as a journalist since 1998, writing for newspapers including The Sunday Times, The Sunday Telegraph, the Daily Mail, Express and Mirror, and magazines including Red, Psychologies, Marie Claire and Elle, as well as writing psychological thrillers.

Kelly also works as a creative writing tutor.

Novels 
Kelly's sixth novel He Said/She Said spent six weeks in the Sunday Times top 10 bestseller list, and was a Richard & Judy Book Club pick.

Her debut,The Poison Tree, was also Richard & Judy Book Club pick, and was turned into a major TV drama.

In 2014, Kelly’s novelisation of the Bafta-winning TV programme Broadchurch became an international bestseller.

Her seventh novel, Stone Mothers, was later published under the title We Know You Know, and was selected as a Richard & Judy Book Club pick in 2020.

Bibliography 
 The Poison Tree (June 2010)
 The Sick Rose (June 2011)
 The Burning Air (January 2013)
 The Ties that Bind (May 2014)
 Broadchurch: The Novel  (August 2014) inspired by the first season of 2013's mega-hit ITV series Broadchurch
 He Said/She Said  (April 2017)
 Stone Mothers  (April 2019)
 Republished as We Know You Know (July 2020)
 Watch Her Fall  (April 2021)
 The Skeleton Key  (September 2022)

References

External links 
 https://web.archive.org/web/20141102182337/http://erinkelly.co.uk/books/index.html

1976 births
English women novelists
English women journalists
Living people
English women non-fiction writers